Yosemite Junction is an unincorporated community in Tuolumne County, California, United States.

References

Unincorporated communities in California
Unincorporated communities in Tuolumne County, California